The 2007 Israeli Basketball League Cup, for sponsorship reasons Winner Cup 2007, was the 2nd edition of the Israeli basketball pre-season tournament. It was played on 14 October-18 October in Jerusalem at the Malha Arena, during the jewish holiday of Sukkot. Maccabi Tel Aviv has won the cup after beating Hapoel Jerusalem 93-74 in the final.
MVP was David Bluthenthal (Maccabi Tel Aviv).

Teams Participating
For the first time, all the teams that finished at the top eight places on the Israeli Preimer League 2006-07 competed in the tournament.

The 9th ranked team, Ironi Ashkelon, and the new promoted team, Hapoel Holon, have played a non-deciding exhibition game as part of the event.

Tournament Bracket
The teams were matched by their last season standings (1st VS 8th, 2nd VS 8th, etc...).

External links
 Winner Cup (Hebrew)

2007
2007–08 in Israeli basketball